Acaulospora nicolsonii is a species of fungi in the family Acaulosporaceae. It forms arbuscular mycorrhiza and vesicles in roots. It was first described in 1984 in a bulletin of the British Mycological Society.

External links
Index Fungorum

References 

Diversisporales

Taxa described in 1984
British Mycological Society
Fungi of the United Kingdom